The Independent Journal, occasionally known as The General Advertiser, was a semi-weekly New York City journal and newspaper edited and published by John McLean and Archibald McLean in the late 18th century. The newspaper's content included contemporary essays and notices.

The Independent Journal is primarily remembered for being one of several newspapers to have initially published The Federalist papers – a series of eighty-five articles and essays discussing and advocating the ratification of the United States Constitution, written by John Jay, James Madison and Alexander Hamilton. It became the first newspaper to publish the material when it released the first Federalist essay on October 27, 1787. The release was accompanied by the following notice:

Over the following month, the next seven essays were published by The Independent Journal and two other newspapers, The New York Packet and The Daily Advertiser.  The essays appeared on Saturdays and Wednesdays in The Independent Journal, and a few days later in the other two. Following its publication of the seventh Federalist, The Independent Journal made an announcement:

In its announcement, the newspaper omitted to note its own publication dates, which continued to be on Wednesdays and Saturdays. However, the plan as outlined in The Independent Journal was not consistently followed; The Daily Advertiser stopped publishing in the agreed order after the release of the tenth essay. From November 30 onward, The New York Packet published on Tuesday and Friday, rather than only Tuesday.

By January 8, 1788, thirty-six Federalist essays had been published between the newspapers. John McLean bundled these thirty-six together and published them as The Federalist: A Collection of Essays, Written in Favour of the New Constitution, as Agreed upon by the Federal Convention, September 17, 1787, Volume I, on March 22, 1788. Publication of the essays resumed on 11 January, and essays thirty-seven to seventy-seven were published from that time through to April 2, 1788. Before the final eight could be published publicly in the newspapers, John McLean compiled and released Volume II of The Federalist essays, which consisted of essays thirty-seven through eighty-five, on May 28, 1788. The eight unpublished essays appeared in The Independent Journal and New York Packet between June 14 and August 16.

Notes

References 

Newspapers published in New York City
The Federalist Papers
Defunct newspapers published in New York (state)